The Vanished is a 1983 role-playing game adventure for Star Trek: The Role Playing Game published by FASA.

Contents
The Vanished is FASA's first complete published scenario for Star Trek: The Role Playing Game and begins with the Enterprise on a routine pass near Federation Deepspace Research Facility 39 that has reduced communications to voice-only relays.

Reception
William A. Barton reviewed The Vanished in Space Gamer No. 70. Barton commented that "The Vanished could provide a good evening's entertainment for your ST play group – and the Deepspace Facility plans could suggest many more to a clever GM."

Reviews
Different Worlds #40 (July/Aug., 1985)

References

Role-playing game supplements introduced in 1983
Star Trek: The Role Playing Game adventures